Air Vice Marshal John Lindsay Barker  (12 November 1910 – 7 May 2004) was a senior officer in the Royal Air Force during the Second World War and the following years. He was the second Commander of the Royal Ceylon Air Force during the early 1960s.

Signals from chiefs of staff to Barker in his capacity as commander Shield Force relating to the re-establishment of British administration in Hong Kong are held in the Liddell Hart Centre for Military Archives, King's College London.

References

Air of Authority – A History of RAF Organisation – Air Vice-Marshal J L Barker

|-

Royal Air Force air marshals
Sri Lanka Air Force air commodores
Royal Air Force personnel of World War II
1910 births
2004 deaths
Companions of the Order of the Bath
Commanders of the Order of the British Empire
Recipients of the Distinguished Flying Cross (United Kingdom)
Military personnel from Kingston upon Hull
Commanders of the Sri Lanka Air Force
Collections of the Liddell Hart Centre for Military Archives